Kulirkaala Megangal is a 1986 Indian Tamil-language film, directed by C. V. Sridhar and produced by K. S. Srinivasan and K. Sivaraman. The film stars Arjun and Sadhana. It was released on 29 August 1986.

Plot

Cast 
Arjun
Sadhana
Kanchana
Vanitha
Jaishankar
Thengai Srinivasan
Manorama
Vennira Aadai Moorthy
Prathapachandran

Soundtrack 
The music was composed by Shankar–Ganesh, with lyrics by Vaali.

References

External links 
 

1980s Tamil-language films
1986 films
Films directed by C. V. Sridhar
Films scored by Shankar–Ganesh
Films with screenplays by C. V. Sridhar